Wilders or The Wilders may refer to:

 Geert Wilders (born 1963), Dutch politician and the leader of the Party for Freedom
Pride (comics)#The Wilder family
 Wilders, Indiana, a town in the US
 "Wilders", a song by Arisa Mizuki from Arisa II: Shake Your Body for Me